Judith Palmer is a Philadelphia-area composer, singer, and arranger. She is one of the founding members of Anna Crusis Women's Choir, America's oldest and longest running feminist choir.

Early life 
Judith Palmer grew up in rural Ohio. Her mother used to say she "came out of the womb singing." The local, public school system, exposed her to musical instrument lessons, and singing opportunities. Her first composition, in 1963, was “The Class Song.” It was conducted by Judith and sung at high school graduation by all 32 members of her graduating class.

Wine, Women and Song 
In 1970, Judith helped start the feminist singing group Wine, Women and Song. The motivation for starting the group was to make up for the dearth of women-composed, women-centered music, and to create music for a day-long radio program of original feminist music for International Women's Day. Judith's first arrangement for this program was "Free of the Burden", to the tune of "Get Along Home Cindy, Cindy". In 1975, Cathy Roma recruited singers from Wine, Women and Song to form Anna Crusis Women's Choir.

Anna Crusis Women's Choir 
Judith is a founding member of Anna Crusis Women's Choir. Since 1975, she has sung in the first soprano section and has served as choir arranger and composer, particularly of four- and five- part acappella pieces written for small ensembles. ANNA’s mission to foster social change and advance the empowerment of women provided a venue for the musical expression of Judith's social commentary. Access to fine singers and the choir’s commitment to LGBTQ+ issues has also provided a place for reflections on her own personal journey.

Compositions and arrangements 
 Mariju-ANNA, original composition, first performed 2 June 2019
 Light of a Clear Blue Morning, re-wording of Craig Hella Johnson's a capella arrangement of Dolly Parton's Light of a Clear Blue Morning, performed December 8, 2018
 Rise Up Again, first performed 3 June 2017
 America, The More Beautiful, re-arrangement of Katharine Lee Bates' America, The Beautiful, first performed 10 December 2016
 Common Ground, 2015
 The Recital, 2015
 What's in a Name?, 2014
 Golden Arches, 2013
 Peace Canon, 2012
 Plutocracy Trumps, 2011
 Breaking for Trout, 2010
 Toast the Earth with Exxon Mobil, re-arrangement of song by the Austin Lounge Lizards, 2010
 A Mighty Shrug, 2009
 Still Fallin' , music commissioned by Sharon Dailey, 2009
 Tumble Me, 2008
 Outside the Bottle, 2007
 On the Wind, first performed June 2007
 Our Remains: The Composting Song, arrangement; words and music by Jamie Foto, 2007
 Cheney at the Pump, text by Calvin Trillin, 2006
 Bushwacked, 2005
 Oldest Feminist Choir on Mission: A quodlibet based on the mission statement of the Anna Crusis Women's Choir, skits by Jennifer Raison, first performed 14 May 2005
 I Believe, barbershop arrangement of "I Believe", 2003
 Mrs. Harold Righteousbomber, arrangement; words and music by Darthe Jennings, 2000; performed by MUSE (Cincinnati Women's Choir)
 Woe to Pinochet, 1999
 37 Bumperstickers, 1998
 Your Satin PJs: An Adult Lullaby, 1996
 Houseboat Holiday, 1995
 Mrs. Harold Righteousbomber, arrangement; wods and music by Darthe Jennings, 1995; performed by Portland Lesbian Choir, Sacramento Women’s Chorus, HerSong (Iowa women's chorus), Juneau Pride Chorus, Alaska Women’s Chorus, New Mexico Women’s Chorus, Womonsong (Madison, WI feminist choir, 1978-1997), Indianapolis Women’s Chorus, and MUSE (Cincinnati Women's Choir)
 Menopause, 1994; appears on 2000 album Spaces Between the Stars, has also been performed by Windsong (Cleveland's feminist chorus), The LimeJello, Marshmallow Surprise, and SheWho (Philadelphia feminist vocal ensemble)
 The Celebration Song, 1994
 Together Proud and Strong, arrangement; words and music by Lynn Thomas, 1993
 Plain song for Kenny, arrangement; words and music by Gwendolyn Burke, 1992; performed by Portland Gay Men's Chorus, 1996, 2012
 Kitchen Ditty, words by Susan Saxe, 1983
 Finny, 1982
 Farmer Brown, arrangement; words and music by Dean Morgan, 1981
 Little Fetuses, arrangement; words by Mybel Johnson, music by Malvina Reynolds
 Finny, 1981
 Whether to Mother, 1980
 Women Friends, 1978
 New Life, words by Linda Bettof, 1977
 Who's Gonna' Shoe, arrangement traditional, 1976
 Still Ain't Satisfied, arrangement; words and music by Bonnie Lockhart of the Red Star Singers, 1974
 Women Friends, 1973
 Free of the Burden, arrangement; words co-authored by Marykae Josh, 1971
 You Can't Stop NOW (when NOW was being attacked by anti-feminists, early 70's)
 Don't Bring Me Posies
 Class Song, 1963

References 

Living people
People from Philadelphia
20th-century American composers
American women composers
Year of birth missing (living people)
20th-century American women musicians
21st-century American women